Timothy P. Dunigan (born August 2, 1955) is an American actor who is best known for having played the lead role of Captain Jonathan Power in Captain Power and the Soldiers of the Future. He also played con-man 1st Lt. Templeton "The Face-Man" Peck in the pilot for the 1980s hit The A-Team, but was replaced by Dirk Benedict for the series. The reason given was that Dunigan was too young for the role, although series creators Frank Lupo and Stephen J. Cannell had wanted Benedict from the start, but were overridden by the network executives.

Early life
Dunigan was born in St. Louis, Missouri to the late Robert S. Dunigan and his Romanian-American wife Olga Dunigan Argint.

Acting career
As to why Dunigan wasn't chosen to participate in The A-Team beyond the pilot, according to the actor himself, "I look[ed] even younger on camera than I am. So it was difficult to accept me as a veteran of the Vietnam War, which ended when I was a sophomore in high school." He played the role of Davy Crockett as a young man in The Magical World of Disney'''s 1988–89 miniseries Davy Crockett. He had guest-starring television roles on several hit series: Cheers, Murder, She Wrote, Empty Nest, Beverly Hills, 90210, and JAG. During a phone interview for G4's Attack of the Show! program, it was revealed that Dunigan had quit acting and became a mortgage broker following his role in JAG'' in 2002.

Family
Dunigan was the cousin of the late sports announcer Harry Caray. His uncle on his mother's side, Nicholas Argint, was a veteran of World War II, member of American Legion Post 111 in Missouri.

Filmography

References

External links
 

1955 births
American male television actors
American male film actors
American people of Romanian descent
Living people
Male actors from St. Louis
20th-century American male actors